The 2015–16 Stephen F. Austin Lumberjacks basketball team represented Stephen F. Austin State University during the 2015–16 NCAA Division I men's basketball season. The Lumberjacks were led by head coach Brad Underwood and played their home games at the William R. Johnson Coliseum. They were members of the Southland Conference. The Lumberjacks finished the season with a record of 28–6, 18–0 in Southland play to win the regular season championship. They won the Southland tournament championship to earn the conference's automatic bid to the NCAA tournament. As a #14 seed, they upset #8 ranked West Virginia in the first round before losing in the final seconds to Notre Dame in the second round.

On March 21, 2016, head coach Brad Underwood left the school and was named the head coach at Oklahoma State.

On May 20, 2020, following the discovery of an administrative error in certifying eligibility for student-athletes, Stephen F. Austin reached an agreement with the NCAA to vacate hundreds of wins across multiple sports from 2013 to 2019, including all 117 men's basketball wins from the 2014–15 to 2018–19 seasons.

Preseason
The Lumberjacks were picked to finish first (1st) in both the Southland Conference Coaches' Poll and in the Sports Information Directors Poll receiving eleven (12) first place votes in the Coaches' poll and ten (9) first place votes in the SID poll.

Roster

Schedule
Source:
Access date: 11/15/2015

|-
!colspan=9 style="background:#330066; color:#FFFFFF;"| Out of Conference

|-
!colspan=9 style="background:#330066; color:#FFFFFF;"| Conference Games

|-
!colspan=9 style="background:#330066; color:#FFFFFF;"| Southland tournament

|-
!colspan=9 style="background:#330066; color:#FFFFFF;"| NCAA tournament

See also
2015–16 Stephen F. Austin Ladyjacks basketball team
List of vacated and forfeited games in college basketball

References

Stephen F. Austin Lumberjacks basketball seasons
Stephen F. Austin
Stephen F. Austin Lumberjacks basketball
Stephen F. Austin Lumberjacks basketball
Stephen F. Austin